Attorney General Brooke may refer to:

Edward Brooke (1919–2015), Attorney General of Massachusetts
Robert Brooke (Virginia governor) (1760–1800), Attorney General of Virginia

See also
General Brooke (disambiguation)